Mohamed Ibrahim Mohamed El Hamaki (born 4 November 1975) is an Egyptian singer. In 2010, he won the "Best Arabia Act" award from MTV Europe Music Awards and the Music Award in 2006, for "Ahla Haga Fiki". He was a coach at the fifth season of The Voice Ahla Sawt in 2019.

Early life and career
Mohamed Hamaki was born on 4 November 1975.

On July 3, 2011, Hamaki was rushed to hospital after suffering multiple heart attacks whilst recording one of his latest albums.

In September 2021, Hamaki collaborated with the American company Epic Games for a concert in the creative mode of the popular videogame Fortnite. In this concert several of his songs could be heard, also his song Leilet El Omr was premiered in the same concert, along with this an emote with part of this song was made available for purchase in the game's Item Shop.

Personal life
On December 7, 2011 Hamaki Married Nahla El Hagry. They later divorced in 2014. 
In April 2016, two years after their divorce, Hamaki and Nahla Reconciled And were Married Again. Hamaki announced that his wife had given birth to a girl on June 6, 2017 whom he named Fatma.

Discography
 Khallina Neysh (2003)
 Ya Ana Ya Enta (2005)
 Kheles El Kalam (2006)
 Bahebak Kol Youm Aktar (2007)
 Naweeha (2008)
 Haga Mosh Tabeaya (2010)
 Mn Alby Baghany (2012)
 Omro Ma Yegheeb (2015)
 Kol Youm Men Dah (2019)
 Tearaf Bahebak Leh (2020)
 Howa Da Habiby (2020)
 Hayatak Fi Sora (2021)
 Leilet El Omr (2021)
 Ya Fatenny (2021)

References

Further reading

External links
 

21st-century Egyptian male singers
Egyptian male actors
Egyptian male film actors
Egyptian male television actors
1975 births
Living people
Singers who perform in Egyptian Arabic
Singers who perform in Classical Arabic